The third season of The Voice, the Indian reality talent show, premiered on 3 February 2019 on StarPlus and concluded on 4 May 2019, with Sumit Saini being crowned as the winner.

A new twist called "Block" was featured, which allows a coach to block another coach from getting a contestant.

Like season 2, the Steal button was featured in The Battles but its number was decreased from two to one steal per coach.

Coaches and hosts

In July 2018, the series was renewed for a third season and it was announced that the series is to be shifted from &TV to StarPlus as the channel sell its broadcasting rights to broadcast its onward seasons to StarPlus. In January 2019, Adnan Sami, Armaan Malik, Harshdeep Kaur and Kanika Kapoor were announced as the new mentors, with A. R. Rahman being the super judge, while Divyanka Tripathi Dahiya was announced as the new host.

Overview

  Winner

  Runner-up

  Third place

  Fourth place

Each coach was allowed to advance four top to the live shows:

Teams
Color key

Blind auditions

Colour key

Episode 1 (3 February)

Episode 2 (9 February)

Episode 3 (10 February)

Episode 4 (16 February)

Episode 5 (17 February)

Episode 6 (23 February)

Episode 7 (24 February)

The Battles 

The Battle Rounds started on 2 March. The coaches can steal one losing artist from other coaches. Contestants who win their battle or are stolen by another coach will advance to the Super Battle rounds.

Color key:

Episode 8 (2 March)

Episode 9 (3 March)

Episode 10 (9 March)

The Super Battles 
The Super Battle episode aired on 10 March. The coaches put three/four of their own team members against each other, with only two artists making a place in the top sixteen and the Grand Gala round.

Color key:

Episode 11 (10 March)

The Grand Gala 

The Grand Gala started on 16 March. In this round, contestants sing individually and there is no elimination.

Episode 12 (16 March)

Episode 13 (17 March)

The Live Shows 

The Live Shows started on 23 March.

Color key:

Episode 14 (23 March)

Episode 15 (24 March)

Episode 16 (30 March)

Episode 17 (31 March)

Episode 18 (6 April)

Episode 19 (7 April)

Episode 25 - Semifinal (28 April) 

Color key:

Episode 26 - Final (4 May) 

Result details

References

External links

The Voice (Indian TV series)
2019 Indian television seasons